Florence Marie Harsant  (née Woodhead, 19 September 1891 – 19 June 1994) was a New Zealand temperance worker, nurse, community leader and writer. She was born in New Plymouth, New Zealand, on 19 September 1891.

In the 1981 Queen's Birthday Honours, Harsant was awarded the Queen's Service Medal for community service.

References

1891 births
1994 deaths
New Zealand nurses
New Zealand temperance activists
New Zealand writers
People from New Plymouth
Recipients of the Queen's Service Medal
New Zealand centenarians
New Zealand women nurses
Women centenarians